Đorđe Radovanović (born 6 May 1993) is a Serbian football midfielder.

References

External links
 
 Đorđe Radovanović stats at utakmica.rs 
 
 
 

1993 births
Living people
Footballers from Belgrade
Association football midfielders
Serbian footballers
Serbia youth international footballers
Serbian expatriate footballers
Expatriate footballers in Portugal
C.F. União players
FK Čukarički players
FK Sinđelić Beograd players
FK Zemun players
FK Dinamo Vranje players
FK Bežanija players
FK Spartak Subotica players
FK Trayal Kruševac players
Serbian SuperLiga players
Serbian First League players
Liga Portugal 2 players